Sheldon Rempal (born August 7, 1995) is a Canadian professional ice hockey winger who is currently playing for the Henderson Silver Knights in the American Hockey League (AHL) while under contract to the Vegas Golden Knights of the National Hockey League (NHL). Prior to turning professional, Rempal played two seasons with Clarkson University where he was named to the NCAA (East) Second All-American Team, NCAA (ECAC) All-Tournament Team, and NCAA (ECAC) First All-Star Team.

Playing career
Rempal played three seasons with the Nanaimo Clippers in the British Columbia Hockey League. At the conclusion of the 2015–16 season, he was named to the BCHL 1st Team All-Stars. While playing for the Clippers, Rempal committed to Clarkson University. He concluded his time with the BCHL playing in 167 games from 2013–2016.
 
Rempal played two seasons with Clarkson University while majoring in business. In his freshman year, Rempal was named to the NCAA (ECAC) All-Rookie Team. In his sophomore year, he was named to the NCAA (East) Second All-American Team, NCAA (ECAC) All-Tournament Team, and NCAA (ECAC) First All-Star Team.

As an unrestricted free agent, Rempal signed a two-year, entry-level contract with the Los Angeles Kings on March 30, 2018. Rempal attended the Kings training camp prior to the 2018–19 season but was reassigned to their American Hockey League (AHL) affiliate, the Ontario Reign, on September 17. Rempal began the 2018–19 season in the AHL, where he recorded eight points in four games, but was recalled to the NHL on October 17. He made his NHL debut the following day on October 18, in a 7–2 loss to the New York Islanders. He played 13:06 minutes of ice time in his debut. Rempal was re-assigned to Ontario Reign on October 27 after playing in three NHL games. On December 3, Rempal was named the AHL Rookie of the Month for November after he collected 12 points in nine games with the Ontario Reign. He was later selected to the Pacific Division All-Stars for the 2019 American Hockey League All-Star Classic.

At the conclusion of his entry-level contract, Rempal as an impending restricted free agent was not tendered a qualifying offer by the Kings and was released to free agency. On October 16, 2020, Rempal was signed to a one-year, two-way, league minimum contract with the Carolina Hurricanes. In the pandemic delayed  season, Rempal appeared in three games with the Hurricanes before he was assigned to AHL affiliate, the Chicago Wolves for the remainder of his contract.

As a free agent from the Hurricanes, Rempal was signed to a one-year, two-way contract with the Vancouver Canucks on July 28, 2021.

On 13 July 2022, Rempal left the Canucks and was signed to a two-year, two-way contract with the Vegas Golden Knights.

Career statistics

Awards and honours

References

External links
 

1995 births
Living people
Abbotsford Canucks players
AHCA Division I men's ice hockey All-Americans
Canadian ice hockey right wingers
Carolina Hurricanes players
Chicago Wolves players
Clarkson Golden Knights men's ice hockey players
Henderson Silver Knights players
Los Angeles Kings players
Nanaimo Clippers players
Ontario Reign (AHL) players
Okotoks Oilers players
Ice hockey people from Calgary
Undrafted National Hockey League players
Vancouver Canucks players
Vegas Golden Knights players